Lindy is an unincorporated community and census-designated place located on the Santee Sioux Reservation in Knox County, in the northeastern part of the state of Nebraska in the Midwestern United States. As of the 2010 census it had a population of 13.

Geography
Nebraska Highway 12 forms the southern edge of the community; the highway leads east  to Crofton and west  to Niobrara.

The community is in the valley of Hoboe Creek, a southwest-flowing tributary of Howe Creek, which in turn flows west to Bazile Creek, a north-flowing tributary of the Missouri River.

Demographics

History

Lindy was established late in the state's history. The townsite was surveyed in 1928, in response to demand for a local marketing and shopping center. Development was further encouraged by a rumor, which later proved unfounded, suggesting that a railroad line might be built through the area. The new town was named after Charles Lindbergh, nicknamed "Lucky Lindy", who the year before had made his celebrated non-stop solo flight from New York to Paris.

During its heyday, Lindy had a number of businesses, including a hardware store, a barbershop, an ice-cream parlor, a blacksmith shop, and an electrical-appliances shop. It also boasted a large hall with a full basement for a garage, a dance hall and movie theater on the second floor, and office and living space on the third. This building was dismantled in 1944. From 1944 to 1958, the local Addison Telephone Company operated out of Lindy.

In later years, Lindy's population declined and its businesses closed. In 1978, it had a population of 38. In the late 1980s and early 1990s, the town's feed store, general store, and gas pumps were shut down or moved away. By 2002, there were 13 residents.

Lindy today

Lindy is an unincorporated community. It is home to one commercial enterprise, the Lindy Country Club restaurant and bar; to a single church, the Good Shepherd Evangelical Lutheran Church; and to a fire hall, operated by the Bloomfield Volunteer Fire Department and Rescue Unit.

Lindy is located on Nebraska Highway 12. It is within the Santee Sioux Reservation.

In 2001, a number of northeastern Nebraska communities formed Shannon Trail Promoters, with the goal of increasing tourism in the forthcoming bicentennial year of the Lewis and Clark Expedition. The organization commissioned thirteen wooden chainsaw sculptures of Private George Shannon, a member of the expedition who became separated from the group in August 1804 and wandered lost for 16 days before rediscovering the party. These statues were placed in participating communities along a  Shannon Trail. Sixteen wayside markers recounting aspects of Shannon's career were also installed along the trail, which runs through the region in which Shannon is thought to have traveled while trying to find and rejoin the expedition. A statue and a marker were placed in Lindy, beside the country club.

References

Census-designated places in Nebraska
Unincorporated communities in Knox County, Nebraska
Unincorporated communities in Nebraska